The 2011 Nigerian Senate election in Akwa Ibom State was held on April 9, 2011, to elect members of the Nigerian Senate to represent Akwa Ibom State. Ita Enang representing Akwa Ibom North East, Aloysius Akan Etok representing Akwa Ibom North West and Helen Esuene representing Akwa Ibom South all won on the platform of Peoples Democratic Party.

Overview

Summary

Results

Akwa Ibom North East 
Peoples Democratic Party candidate Ita Enang won the election, defeating other party candidates.

Akwa Ibom North West 
Peoples Democratic Party candidate Aloysius Akan Etok won the election, defeating Action Congress of Nigeria candidate Joseph Upkong and other party candidates.

Akwa Ibom South 
Peoples Democratic Party candidate Helen Uduoakaha won the election, defeating Action Congress of Nigeria candidate Joseph Upkong and other party candidates.

References 

April 2011 events in Nigeria
Akwa Ibom State Senate elections
2011 Nigerian Senate elections